Gianluca Luddi (born 4 February 1978) is an Italian former professional tennis player.

Born in Rome, Luddi had a best singles world ranking of 183 and won an ATP Challenger title at Bressanone in 1999, beating Thierry Guardiola in the final. He had wins over top-100 players Jacobo Díaz and Guillermo Cañas en route to the semi-finals of the 1999 Buenos Aires Challenger. In 2000 he featured in the qualifying draw for the French Open.

Luddi now coaches tennis in Turin and is married to tennis player Stefania Chieppa.

Challenger/Futures titles

Singles: (5)

References

External links
 
 

1978 births
Living people
Italian male tennis players
Tennis players from Rome
21st-century Italian people